June Allyson (born Eleanor Geisman; October 7, 1917 – July 8, 2006) was an American stage, film, and television actress, dancer, and singer.

Allyson began her career in 1937 as a dancer in short subject films and on Broadway in 1938. She signed with MGM in 1943, and rose to fame the following year in Two Girls and a Sailor. Allyson's "girl next door" image was solidified during the mid-1940s when she was paired with actor Van Johnson in six films. In 1951, she won the Golden Globe Award for Best Actress for her performance in Too Young to Kiss. From 1959 to 1961, she hosted and occasionally starred in her own anthology series, The DuPont Show with June Allyson, which aired on CBS from 1959 to 1961.

In the 1970s, she returned to the stage starring in Forty Carats and No, No, Nanette. In 1982, Allyson released her autobiography June Allyson by June Allyson, and continued her career with guest starring roles on television and occasional film appearances. She later established the June Allyson Foundation for Public Awareness and Medical Research and worked to raise money for research for urological and gynecological diseases affecting senior citizens. During the 1980s, Allyson also became a spokesperson for Depend undergarments, in a successful marketing campaign that has been credited in reducing the social stigma of incontinence. She made her final onscreen appearance in 2001.

Allyson was married four times (to three husbands) and had two children with her first husband, Dick Powell. She died of respiratory failure and bronchitis in July 2006 at the age of 88.

Early life
Allyson was born Eleanor Geisman, nicknamed Ella, in The Bronx, New York City. She was the daughter of Clara (née Provost) and Robert Geisman. She had a brother, Henry, who was two years older. She said she had been raised as a Catholic, but a discrepancy exists relating to her early life, and her studio biography was often the source of the confusion. Her paternal grandparents, Harry Geisman and Anna Hafner, were immigrants from Germany although Allyson claimed her last name was originally "Van Geisman", and was of Dutch origin. Studio biographies listed her as Jan Allyson born to Franco-English parents. Upon her death, her daughter said Allyson was born "Eleanor Geisman to a French mother and Dutch father." In an interview with Larry King Allyson denied being of German Jewish descent.

In April 1918 (when Allyson was six months old), her alcoholic father, who had worked as a janitor, abandoned the family. Allyson was brought up in near poverty, living with her maternal grandparents. To make ends meet, her mother worked as a telephone operator and restaurant cashier. When she had enough funds, she occasionally reunited with her daughter, but more often Allyson was "farmed" to her grandparents or other relatives.

Accident
In 1925 (when Allyson was eight), a tree branch fell on her while she was riding her tricycle with her pet terrier in tow. Allyson sustained a fractured skull and broken back, and her dog was killed. Her doctors said she never would walk again and confined her to a heavy steel brace from neck to hips for four years, and she ultimately regained her health, but when Allyson had become famous, she was terrified that people would discover her background from the "tenement side of New York City", and she readily agreed to studio tales of a "rosy life", including a concocted story that she underwent months of swimming exercises in rehabilitation to emerge as a star swimmer. In her later memoirs, Allyson describes a summer program of swimming that did help her recovery.

After gradually progressing from a wheelchair to crutches to braces, Allyson's true escape from her impoverished life was to go to the cinema, where she was enraptured by Ginger Rogers and Fred Astaire movies. As a teen, Allyson memorized the trademark dance routines of Ginger Rogers; she claimed later to have watched The Gay Divorcee 17 times. She also tried to emulate the singing styles of movie stars, but she never mastered reading music.

When her mother remarried and the family was reunited with a more stable financial standing, Allyson was enrolled in the Ned Wayburn Dancing Academy and began to enter dance competitions with the stage name of Elaine Peters.

Career

Early work
With the death of her stepfather and a bleak future ahead, she left high school midway through her junior year to seek jobs as a dancer. Her first $60-a-week job was as a tap dancer at the Lido Club in Montreal. Returning to New York City, she found work as an actress in movie short subjects filmed by Educational Pictures at its Astoria, Queens NY studio.

Fiercely ambitious, Allyson tried her hand at modeling, but to her consternation became the "sad-looking before part" in a before-and-after bathing suit magazine ad.

Musical shorts
Her first career break came when Educational cast her as an ingenue opposite singer Lee Sullivan, comic dancers Herman Timberg, Jr., and Pat Rooney, Jr., and future comedy star Danny Kaye in a series of shorts. These included Swing for Sale (1937), Pixilated (1937), Ups and Downs (1937), Dime a Dance (1938), Dates and Nuts (1938) and Sing for Sweetie (1938).

When Educational ceased operations, Allyson moved to Vitaphone in Brooklyn and starred or co-starred (with dancer Hal Le Roy) in musical shorts. These included The Prisoner of Swing (1938), The Knight Is Young (1938), Rollin' in Rhythm (1939) and All Girl Revue (1940).

Broadway
Interspersing jobs in the chorus line at the Copacabana Club with acting roles at Vitaphone, the diminutive 5'1", below-100-pound Allyson landed a chorus job in the Broadway show Sing Out the News in 1938.

The “legend” around her stage name is that the choreographer gave her a job and a new name: Allyson, a family name, and June, for the month, although like many aspects of her career resume, the story is highly unlikely as she was already dubbing herself "June Allyson" prior to her Broadway engagement. At one point she attributed the name to a director she worked with even later.

Allyson subsequently appeared in the chorus in the Jerome Kern–Oscar Hammerstein II musical Very Warm for May (1939).

When Vitaphone discontinued New York production in 1940, Allyson returned to the stage to take on more chorus roles in Rodgers and Hart's Higher and Higher (1940) and Cole Porter's Panama Hattie (1940).

Her dancing and musical talent led to a stint as an understudy for the lead, Betty Hutton, and when Hutton contracted measles, Allyson appeared in five performances of Panama Hattie. Broadway director George Abbott caught one of performances and offered Allyson one of the lead roles in his production of Best Foot Forward (1941).

Early films
After her appearance in the Broadway musical, Allyson was selected for the 1943 film version of Best Foot Forward. When she arrived in Hollywood, the production had not started, so MGM "placed her on the payroll" of Girl Crazy (1943). Despite playing a "bit part", Allyson received good reviews as a sidekick to Best Foot Forwards star, Lucille Ball, but was still relegated to the "drop list."

MGM's musical supervisor Arthur Freed saw her screen test sent up by an agent and insisted that Allyson be put on contract immediately. Another musical, Thousands Cheer (1943), was a showcase for her singing, albeit still in a minor role.

As a new starlet, although Allyson had already been a performer on stage and screen for over five years, she was presented as an "overnight sensation", with Hollywood press agents attempting to portray her as an ingenue, selectively slicing years off her true age. Studio bios listed her variously as being born in 1922 and 1923.

Rising fame
Allyson's breakthrough was in Two Girls and a Sailor (1944) where the studio image of the "girl next door" was fostered by her being cast alongside long-time acting chum Van Johnson, the quintessential "boy next door." As the "sweetheart team", Johnson and Allyson were to appear together in four later films.

Allyson supported Lucille Ball again in Meet the People (1944), which was a flop. It was on this film she met Dick Powell, whom she later married.

She supported Margaret O'Brien in Music for Millions (1944) and was billed after Robert Walker and Hedy Lamarr in the romantic comedy Her Highness and the Bellboy (1945).

Stardom

Allyson was top-billed along with Walker in The Sailor Takes a Wife (1945). She had a role in Two Sisters from Boston (1946) with Kathryn Grayson and Peter Lawford, and was one of several MGM stars in Till the Clouds Roll By (1946). She also appeared in her first drama, The Secret Heart, in 1946 with Claudette Colbert and Walter Pidgeon.

She was reunited with Johnson in High Barbaree (1947) and followed with the musical Good News, also in 1947.

Allyson starred with Johnson in the 1948 comedy The Bride Goes Wild, then played Constance in the hugely popular 1948 The Three Musketeers (1948). Her song "Thou Swell" was a high point of the Rodgers and Hart biopic Words and Music (1948), as performed in the "A Connecticut Yankee" segment with the Blackburn Twins.

Allyson played the tomboy Jo March in Little Women (1949), which was a huge hit. She was adept at crying on cue, and many of her films incorporated a crying scene. Fellow MGM player Margaret O'Brien recalled that she and Allyson were known as "the town criers". "I cried once in a picture and they said 'Let's do it again', and I cried for the rest of my career", she later said.

The same year, MGM announced Allyson would be in Forever by Mildred Crann, but the project was dropped. Instead, she starred in The Stratton Story (1949) with James Stewart, which she later said was her favorite film.

She made two films with Dick Powell: The Reformer and the Redhead (1950) and Right Cross (1950), after which she was reunited with Johnson in Too Young to Kiss (1951).

In 1950, Allyson had been signed to appear opposite her childhood idol Fred Astaire in Royal Wedding, but had to leave the production due pregnancy. She was replaced initially by Judy Garland, who in turn was replaced by Jane Powell.

Allyson played a doctor in The Girl in White (1952), which lost revenue, and a nurse in Battle Circus (1953), a hit. She started in Remains to Be Seen (1953) with Johnson, which was a flop. In May 1953, she and MGM agreed to part ways by mutual consent.

Post MGM
In 1954, Allyson was in a huge Universal Pictures hit, The Glenn Miller Story, as well as another successful MGM film, Executive Suite. She also starred the Fox Film Woman's World, which was less successful.

Allyson was teamed with Stewart again in Strategic Air Command (1955) at Paramount, another success.

She had a change of pace in The Shrike (1955) with José Ferrer at Universal; it flopped. More popular was The McConnell Story (1955) with Alan Ladd at Warner Bros.

In 1956, Allyson did some musical remakes of classic films, The Opposite Sex, a remake of The Women at MGM, and You Can't Run Away from It, a remake of It Happened One Night at Columbia, which was directed by Powell.

In 1957, she signed with Universal and did two more remakes: Interlude, a drama for Douglas Sirk, and My Man Godfrey, a comedy with David Niven. She then made A Stranger in My Arms (1958) with Jeff Chandler. The box office failure of these films effectively ended her reign as an A-list movie star.

Television
The DuPont Show with June Allyson (1959–60) ran for two seasons on CBS and was an attempt to use a high budget formula. She later called it "the hardest thing I ever did." Her efforts were dismissed by an entertainment critic in the LA Examiner as "reaching down to the level of mag fiction." However, TV Guide and other fan magazines such as TV Magazine considered Allyson's foray into television as revitalizing her fame and career for a younger audience, and remarked that her typecasting by the movie industry as the "girl next door" was a "waste and neglect of talent on its own doorstep."

She also appeared on shows like Zane Grey Theater, The Dick Powell Theatre and Burke's Law before retiring for several years after the death of Powell in 1963.

Return to acting
Allyson returned to acting with an appearance in The Name of the Game. In 1970, she briefly starred in Forty Carats on Broadway.

Throughout the 1970s, she appeared regularly on television shows such as See the Man Run (1971), The Sixth Sense (1972), and Letters from Three Lovers (1973), as well as in the film They Only Kill Their Masters (1972).

Later appearances include Curse of the Black Widow (1977), Three on a Date (1978), Vega$ (1978), Blackout (1978), House Calls, The Kid with the Broken Halo (1982) Simon & Simon, The Love Boat, Hart to Hart, Murder, She Wrote, Misfits of Science, Crazy Like a Fox, and Airwolf. Her last appearance was in These Old Broads (2001).

Allyson made a special appearance in 1994 in That's Entertainment III, as one of the film's narrators. She spoke about MGM's golden era and introduced vintage film clips.

Until 2003, Allyson remained busy touring the country making personal appearances, headlining celebrity cruises, and speaking on behalf of Kimberly-Clark, a long-time commercial interest.

Allyson became the spokesperson for Depend, a diaper line for adults with incontinence, in 1984. The American Urogynecologic Society established the June Allyson Foundation in 1998, made possible by a grant from Kimberly-Clark. The foundation raises money for incontinence education and research. As the first celebrity to undertake the role of public spokesperson for promoting the use of the Depend undergarment, Allyson did "more than any other public figure to encourage and persuade people with incontinence to lead fuller and more active lives".

Personal life

Marriages and children

On her arrival in Hollywood, studio heads attempted to enhance the pairing of Van Johnson and Allyson by sending out the two contracted players on a series of "official dates", which were highly publicized and led to a public perception that a romance had been kindled. Although dating David Rose, Peter Lawford, and John F. Kennedy, Allyson was actually being courted by Dick Powell, who was 13 years her senior and had been previously married to Mildred Maund and Joan Blondell.

On August 19, 1945, Allyson caused MGM studio chief Louis B. Mayer some consternation by marrying Dick Powell. After defying him twice by refusing to stop seeing Powell, in a "tactical master stroke", she asked Mayer to give her away at the wedding. He was so disarmed that he agreed but put Allyson on suspension anyway.

The Powells had two children, Pamela Allyson Powell (adopted in 1948 through the Tennessee Children's Home Society in an adoption arranged by Georgia Tann) and Richard Powell, Jr., born December 24, 1950.

In the mid 1950s, Allyson reportedly had an affair with actor Alan Ladd.

In 1961, Allyson underwent a kidney operation and later, throat surgery, temporarily affecting her trademark raspy voice. She filed for divorce that year, the reason being Powell's devotion to work. In February 1961, Allyson was awarded $2.5 million in settlement, along with custody of their children, in an interlocutory divorce decree. However, before the divorce was final, they reconciled and remained married until his death on January 2, 1963. Later, Allyson reflected on how the loss of Powell affected her:

This loss prompted Allyson to start drinking heavily. In 1963, she was going to elope with Powell's barber, Glenn Maxwell, but decided against it. She and Maxwell would later get married and divorced, then married and divorced again between 1963 and 1970.

She also went through a bitter court battle with her mother over the custody of the children. Reports at the time revealed that writer/director Dirk Summers, with whom Allyson was romantically involved from 1963 to 1975, was named legal guardian for Ricky and Pamela as a result of a court petition. Members of the nascent jet-set, Allyson and Summers were frequently seen in Cap d'Antibes, Madrid, Rome, and London. However, Summers refused to marry her and the relationship did not last.

During this time, Allyson struggled with alcoholism, which she overcame in the mid-1970s.

In 1976, Allyson married David Ashrow, a dentist turned actor. The couple occasionally performed together in regional theater, and in the late 1970s and early 1980s, toured the US in the play My Daughter, Your Son. They also appeared on celebrity cruiseship tours on the Royal Viking Sky ocean liner in a program that highlighted Allyson's movie career.

Philanthropy and advertising
After Dick Powell's death, Allyson committed herself to charitable work on his behalf, championing the importance of research in urological and gynecological diseases in seniors.

Allyson represented the Kimberly-Clark Corporation in commercials for adult incontinence products. She was initially reticent to participate, but her mother, who had incontinence, convinced her that it was her duty in light of her successful career. The product proved a success. In 1993, actor-turned-agent Marty Ingels publicly charged Allyson with not paying his large commission on the earlier deal on incontinence product advertising. Allyson denied owing any money, and Ashrow and she filed a lawsuit for slander and emotional distress, charging that Ingels was harassing and threatening them, stating Ingels made 138 phone calls during a single eight-hour period. Earlier that year, Ingels had pleaded no contest to making annoying phone calls.

Following a lifelong interest in health and medical research (Allyson had initially wanted to use her acting career to fund her own training as a doctor), she was instrumental in establishing the June Allyson Foundation for Public Awareness and Medical Research.

Allyson also financially supported her brother, Dr. Arthur Peters, through his medical training, and he went on to specialize in otolaryngology.

Politics
Allyson was a staunch Republican and strong supporter of Richard Nixon. Her daughter served as Chairman of the Inaugural Concerts for Nixon's second inauguration in 1973. Allyson also supported Barry Goldwater in the 1964 United States presidential election.

Later years
Powell's wealth made it possible for Allyson effectively to retire from show business after his death, making only occasional appearances on talk and variety shows. Allyson returned to the Broadway stage in 1970 in the play Forty Carats and later toured in a production of No, No, Nanette.

Her autobiography, June Allyson by June Allyson (1982), received generally complimentary reviews due to its insider look at Hollywood in one of its golden ages. A more critical appraisal came from Janet Maslin at the New York Times in her review, "Hollywood Leaves Its Imprint on Its Chroniclers", who noted: "Miss Allyson presents herself as the same sunny, tomboyish figure she played on screen in Hollywood... like someone who has come to inhabit the very myths she helped to create on the screen." Privately, Allyson admitted that her earlier screen portrayals had left her uneasy about the typecast "good wife" roles she had played.

As a personal friend of Ronald and Nancy Reagan, she was invited to many White House dinners, and in 1988, Reagan appointed her to the Federal Council on Aging. Allyson and her later husband, David Ashrow, actively supported fund-raising efforts for both the James Stewart and Judy Garland museums; both Stewart and Garland had been close friends.

In December 1993, Allyson christened the Holland America Maasdam, one of the flagships of the Holland America Line. Although her heritage, like much of her personal story, was subject to different interpretations, Allyson always claimed to be proud of a Dutch ancestry.

In 1996, Allyson became the first recipient of the Harvey Award, presented by the James M. Stewart Museum Foundation, in recognition of her positive contributions to the world of entertainment.

Death
Following hip-replacement surgery in 2003, Allyson's health began to deteriorate. With her husband at her side, she died July 8, 2006, aged 88 at her home in Ojai, California. Her death was a result of pulmonary respiratory failure and acute bronchitis. On her death, Kimberly-Clark Corporation contributed $25,000 to the June Allyson Foundation to support research advances in the care and treatment of women with urinary incontinence. Along with her husband, she was survived by her daughter, Pamela Powell, her son, Richard, a grandson, and her brother.

Awards and honors
1951: won the Golden Globe for Best Motion Picture Actress-Musical/Comedy, for Too Young to Kiss
1954: awarded the Special Jury Prize for Ensemble Acting at the Venice Festival, for Executive Suite, in the same year that she was voted Most Popular Female Star by Photoplay magazine
1955: named the ninth most popular movie star in the annual Quigley Exhibitors Poll and the second most popular female star, after Grace Kelly
1960: received a motion pictures star on the Hollywood Walk of Fame at 1537 Vine Street for her contributions to the film industry
1985: received the Cannes Festival Distinguished Service Award
2007: received a special tribute during the Academy Awards as part of the annual memorial tribute

Broadway credits

Filmography

Box office ranking
For a number of years exhibitors voted Allyson among the most popular stars in the country:
1949 – 16th (US)
1950 – 14th (US)
1954 – 11th (US)
1955 – 9th (US)
1956 – 15th (US)
1957 – 23rd (US)

Radio appearances

See also

 List of actors with Hollywood Walk of Fame motion picture stars

ReferencesExplanatory notesCitationsBibliography'''

 Allyson, June. June Allyson's Feeling Great: A Daily Dozen Exercises for Creative Aging. New York: Da Capo Press, 1987. .
 
 Basinger, Jeanine. The Star Machine. New York: Knopf, 2007. .
 Becker, Christine. It's the Pictures That Got Small: Hollywood Film Stars on 1950s Television (Wesleyan Film). Indianapolis, Indiana: Wesleyan, 2009. .
 Davis, Ronald L. Van Johnson: MGM's Golden Boy (Hollywood Legends Series). Jackson, Mississippi: University Press of Mississippi, 2001. .
 Eyman, Scott. Lion of Hollywood: The Life and Legend of Louis B. Meyer. New York: Simon & Schuster, 2005. .
 Fordin, Hugh. M-G-M's Greatest Musicals. New York: Da Capo Press, 1996. .
 Hirschhorn, Clive. The Hollywood Musical. London: Pyramid Books, 1991, first edition 1981. .
 Kennedy, Matthew. Joan Blondell: A Life between Takes (Hollywood Legends Series). Jackson, Mississippi: University Press of Mississippi, 2007. .
 Milner, Jay Dunston. Confessions of a Maddog: A Romp through the High-flying Texas Music and Literary Era of the Fifties to the Seventies. Denton, Texas: University of North Texas Press, 1998. .
 Mormon, Robert. Demises of the Distinguished. Bloomington, Indiana: AuthorHouse, 2007. .
 Parish, James Robert and Michael R. Pitts. Hollywood Songsters: Singers Who Act and Actors who can Sing. London: Routledge, 2003. .
 Wayne, Jane Ellen. The Golden Girls of MGM: Greta Garbo, Joan Crawford, Lana Turner, Judy Garland, Ava Gardner, Grace Kelly and Others. New York: Carroll & Graf Publishers, 2002. .
 Wayne, Jane Ellen. The Leading Men of MGM. New York: Da Capo Press, 2006. .

External links

 
 
 
 
 
 Joe Daurril's Allyson Without Tears
 Obituary in the Los Angeles Daily News Obituary in The New York Times'' (July 11, 2006)
 Photographs and literature

1917 births
2006 deaths
American film actresses
American musical theatre actresses
American stage actresses
American television actresses
American female dancers
Dancers from New York (state)
20th-century American memoirists
American women memoirists
Best Musical or Comedy Actress Golden Globe (film) winners
Metro-Goldwyn-Mayer contract players
Deaths from bronchitis
Deaths from respiratory failure
Burials at Forest Lawn Memorial Park (Glendale)
Actresses from New York City
Entertainers from the Bronx
California Republicans
20th-century American actresses
21st-century American actresses
20th-century American singers
Age controversies
20th-century American women singers
Actresses from the Golden Age of Hollywood
American people of German descent
New York (state) Republicans